Christopher Alan Hall (born 1950) is an American Episcopal theologian who is a leading exponent of paleo-orthodox theology. He was the Chancellor of Eastern University, the dean of the Templeton Honors College, and, together with the United Methodist theologian Thomas C. Oden, another paleo-orthodox scholar, he edits the Ancient Christian Commentary on Scripture. He has stated that his goal as a theologian is, "to introduce modern Christians to the world of the early church, particularly because the Holy Spirit has a history."

Hall and his wife Debbie have three children: Nathan, Nathalie, and Joshua.

Publications
Ancient Christian Commentary on Scripture series, Associate editor with Thomas C. Oden (InterVarsity Press, Ongoing)
Ancient Christian Commentary on Scripture: The Gospel of Mark, with Thomas C. Oden, (InterVarsity Press, June, 1998)
Reading the Scripture with the Church Fathers (InterVarsity Press, September, 1998)
Realized Religion: Research on Religion and Health, with Theodore Chamberlain (Templeton Foundation Press, Fall 2000)
Ancient and Postmodern Christianity, with Kenneth Tanner (IVP, 2002)
Studying Theology with the Church Fathers (InterVarsity Press, 2002)
 
Worshiping with the Church Fathers (InterVarsity Press, 2009)
Does God Have a Future: A Debate on Divine Providence, with John Sanders (Baker Academic, 2003)
Making Room for God: Spiritual Formation for Christian Leaders with David Fraser (The Center for Organizational Excellence, 1997)

References

1950 births
21st-century American Episcopalians
21st-century American non-fiction writers
21st-century American theologians
21st-century Anglican theologians
American Episcopal theologians
Drew University alumni
Eastern University (United States)
Fuller Theological Seminary alumni
Living people
Patristic scholars
Regent College alumni
University of California, Los Angeles alumni